The Beach Pneumatic Transit was the first attempt to build an underground public transit system in New York City. It was developed by Alfred Ely Beach in 1869 as a demonstration subway line running on pneumatic power. The subway line had one stop in the basement of the Rogers Peet Building and a one-car shuttle going back and forth . It was not a regular mode of transportation, and lasted from 1870 until 1873.

History

Alfred Ely Beach demonstrated a model of basic pneumatic subway system, in which air pressure in the tube pushed the cars, at the American Institute Exhibition in New York in 1867. After demonstrating that the model was viable, in 1869 Beach and his Beach Pneumatic Transit Company began constructing a pneumatically powered subway line beneath Broadway. Funneled through a company he set up, Beach put up $350,000 of his own money to pay for the full-scale test project. Built with a tunneling shield, the tunnel was complete in only 58 days.

However, one of the city's top politicians of the day, William "Boss" Tweed, refused to support the project. With no initial political support for the project, Beach started the project by claiming he was building postal tubes. The initial permit was to install a pair of smaller postal tubes below Broadway; however, Tweed later amended the permit to allow the excavation of a single large tunnel, wherein the smaller tubes could reside. The exact location of the tubes was determined during construction by compass and survey as well as verified by driving jointed rods of iron up through the roof of the tunnel to the pavement. The line was built as a demonstration of a pneumatic transit system, open to the public with a 25-cent fare per person. Proceeds for the admission went to the Union Home and School for Soldiers' and Sailors' Orphans.

For the public, the project was used as an attraction. It ran only a single car on its one-block-long track to a dead-end at its terminus, and passengers would simply ride out and back, to see what the proposed subway might be like. During its first two weeks of operation, the Beach Pneumatic Transit sold over 11,000 rides, and over 400,000 total rides in its single year of operation.  Although the public showed initial approval, Beach was delayed in getting permission to expand it due to official obstruction for various reasons. By the time he finally gained permission in 1873, public and financial support had waned, and the subway was closed down within the year. The project was shut down when a stock market crash caused investors to withdraw support. It is unclear that such a system could have been practical for a large-scale subway network.

After the project was shut down, the tunnel entrance was sealed. The station, built in part of the basement of the Rogers Peet Building, was reclaimed for other uses until the entire building was lost to fire in 1898. In 1912, workers excavating for the BMT Broadway Line (serving the present-day ) dug into the old Beach tunnel, where they found the remains of the car, the tunnelling shield used during initial construction, and even the piano in the subway's waiting room. The shield was removed and donated to Cornell University, which has since lost track of its whereabouts. The tunnel was almost completely within the limits of the Broadway Line's City Hall station, but it is rumored that a small portion could still be accessed by a manhole on Reade Street. The New-York Historical Society commissioned a plaque honoring Alfred Beach to be placed in the City Hall station.

Although the Beach Pneumatic Transit lasted for only three years, the project gave rise to the New York pneumatic tube mail system, which was based on the request that Beach had made to Tweed and which ran until 1953.

Design

Aesthetics
The ornate station had frescoes and s. It was illuminated by zirconia lamps that revealed the luxurious interior. There were statues and a goldfish pond in the station that people could view while they waited to enter the ride.

Technical specifications
The car could hold 22 people, and the riders would enter the site at Devlin's Clothing Store, a well-known shop at 260 Broadway, on the southwest corner of Warren Street.

The ride was controlled by a  Roots blower, nicknamed "the Western Tornado", built by Roots Patent Force Rotary Blowers (see Roots Blower Company). When the car reached the end, baffles on the blower system were reversed, and the car was pulled back by the suction.

For the tunnels, Beach used a circular design based upon Brunel's rectangular shield, which may represent the shift in design from rectangular to cylindrical.  It was unclear when or who transitioned the tunneling shield design from rectangular to circular until The New York Times wrote an article describing the original Beach tunneling shield in 1870.

Related developments

The Crystal Palace pneumatic railway was a similar but longer system which operated in 1864 on the grounds of the Crystal Palace in London.

In pop culture
 The Beach Pneumatic Transit is featured in the direct-to-video sequel An American Tail: The Treasure of Manhattan Island and serves as a plot point of the story.
 "Sub-Rosa Subway" is a 1976 song by Klaatu which describes the subway's construction, station, and its public reception.
 In the 1989 film Ghostbusters II, a fictional pneumatic transit station and tunnel reminiscent of the Beach system is discovered by the Ghostbusters beneath First Avenue in Manhattan; the tunnel's completion date appears on-screen as 1870, the same year that the Warren-to-Murray tunnel was completed.
 In the 1990 film Teenage Mutant Ninja Turtles, the abandoned subway tunnel they live in is in reference to the pneumatic transit.
The 2015 novel, Lair of Dreams by Libba Bray, (sequel to 2012's The Diviners) serves as a main plot point. The abandoned City Hall tunnel features heavily as a setting in both the real world and the dream world.

See also 

 Atmospheric railway
 Cobble Hill Tunnel, a similar abandoned tunnel in New York City
 Gravity-vacuum transit
 Track 61 (New York City), another private railroad tunnel in New York City

References
Notes

Citations

Further reading

 Most, Doug, The Race Underground : Boston, New York, and the incredible rivalry that built America's first subway (New York: St. Martin's Press, 2014), .
The First New York Subway: Beach Pneumatic Transit Sometimes Interesting. May 19, 2012
The Secret Subway: Episode of American Experience about the subway
No. 1474: Beach's Secret Subway: Episode of The Engines of Our Ingenuity about the subway
"Pneumatic Transit" Animation by Abby Digital
The Beach Pneumatic Transit Company - Just a Bunch of Hot Air? from the Museum of the City of New York Collections blog

External links

"Beach Pneumatic Transit" at Abandoned Stations, by Joseph Brennan
"Beach Pneumatic Transit" on nycsubway.org

Pneumatics
History of transportation in New York City
History of rail transportation in the United States
Railway lines opened in 1870
1873 disestablishments in New York (state)
Transportation in Manhattan
Former buildings and structures in Manhattan
1870 establishments in New York (state)